In E. coli and other bacteria, holD is a gene that encodes the psi subunit of DNA polymerase III.

References 

Bacterial proteins
DNA replication